Eli Fara  (born 21 May 1967) is an Albanian singer. Prior to 2000, she was awarded the Merited Artist of Albania by the Government of Albania.

Life and career 

Fara was born on 21 May 1967 in the city of Korçë, then part of the People's Socialist Republic, present Albania. She is an ethnic Aromanian. She first came to prominence as a performer of the urban folk songs of her home region. In 1988, she was invited to appear at the National Folklore Festival in Gjirokastër. Albania had no record industry to speak of prior to the fall of Communism and as late as 1993 it was still only possible to buy cassette albums by a handful of artists - one of whom was Eli Fara. She has spent much of the intervening period overseas but has remained very popular in her native country. In recent years she has recorded more modern music although she still sings some of the folk songs from Korçë that first brought her to the attention of the Albanian public. In 2012, Fara was a finalist at Kënga Magjike (The Magic song) with "Romale", a song mixed with various genres.

References 

1967 births
Living people
People from Korçë
Merited Artists of Albania
Albanian-language singers
Albanian people of Aromanian descent
Aromanian musicians
21st-century Albanian women singers
Festivali i Këngës contestants
Albanian pop musicians
20th-century Albanian women singers